Trevorite is a rare nickel iron oxide mineral belonging to the spinel group. It has the chemical formula NiFe3+2O4. It is a black mineral with the typical spinel properties of crystallising in the cubic system, black streaked, infusible and insoluble in most acids.

There is at least partial solid solution between trevorite and magnetite, with many magnetites from ultramafic rocks containing at least trace amounts of Ni. Fe2+ and Mg2+ may substitute for Ni in trevorite.

Discovery and occurrence
It was first described for an occurrence in the	Bon Accord Nickel Deposit, Bon Accord, Barberton, Mpumalanga, South Africa, in 1921 and was named for Major Tudor Gryffydd Trevor (1865–1954) who was a mining inspector in South Africa.

In the Bon Accord deposit it occurred as a contact deposit between an ultramafic intrusion and a quartzite. In an occurrence at Mount Clifford, Australia, it occurs associated with a nickel sulfide orebody adjacent to a gabbro which intruded peridotite. Associated minerals include nimite, willemseite, nickeloan talc, violarite, millerite, reevesite and goethite at Bon Accord; and with native nickel, heazlewoodite and millerite at Mt. Clifford.

It has also been reported from the Logatchev-1 hydrothermal field on the Mid-Atlantic Ridge; in the Hatrurim Formation in the Negev Desert in Israel; the Josephine Creek District, Josephine County, Oregon and the Gabbs District of Nye County, Nevada.

References

Iron(III) minerals
Nickel minerals
Spinel group
Cubic minerals
Minerals in space group 227